Carla Rebecchi (born 7 September 1984) is an Argentine field hockey player who won the bronze medal at the 2008 Summer Olympics in Beijing and the silver medal at the 2012 Summer Olympics in London with the Argentina national field hockey team. In 2010, she won the World Cup in Rosario, Argentina. Carla also won six Champions Trophy, the 2014–2015 World League, three medals at the Pan American Games and two Pan American Cups.

After Luciana Aymar retired and Macarena Rodriguez was left out of the national team after the 2015 Pan American Games, she was selected to be the captain. In February 2017 she announced her retirement after 290 matches and 153 goals, and returned after becoming a mother in 3 September 2018.

References
 The Official Website of the Beijing 2008 Olympic Games
 Confederación Argentina de Hockey Official site of the Argentine Hockey Confederation

External links
 
 
 

1984 births
Living people
Argentine female field hockey players
Las Leonas players
Olympic field hockey players of Argentina
Field hockey players at the 2007 Pan American Games
Field hockey players at the 2008 Summer Olympics
Field hockey players at the 2011 Pan American Games
Olympic bronze medalists for Argentina
Field hockey players from Buenos Aires
Olympic medalists in field hockey
Olympic silver medalists for Argentina
Field hockey players at the 2012 Summer Olympics
Argentine people of Italian descent
Medalists at the 2012 Summer Olympics
Medalists at the 2008 Summer Olympics
Pan American Games gold medalists for Argentina
Pan American Games silver medalists for Argentina
Field hockey players at the 2016 Summer Olympics
Pan American Games medalists in field hockey
Field hockey players at the 2019 Pan American Games
University of Palermo (Buenos Aires) alumni
Medalists at the 2007 Pan American Games
Medalists at the 2011 Pan American Games
Medalists at the 2019 Pan American Games
21st-century Argentine women